Southridge High School may refer to:

 Southridge High School (Kennewick), in Kennewick, Washington, United States
 Southridge High School (Beaverton, Oregon), in Beaverton, Oregon, United States
 Miami Southridge High School, in Miami, Florida, United States
 Southridge High School (Huntingburg, Indiana), United States
 Southridge School, in Surrey, British Columbia, Canada
 PAREF Southridge School, in Muntinlupa, Metro Manila, Philippines

See also
South Ridge High School, in Phoenix, Arizona